Tarek Heggy (born October 12, 1950) is an Egyptian liberal author, political thinker and international petroleum strategist. Heggy is one of Egypt’s more prominent authors on the subject of Egypt’s need for political reform.  His extensive writings advocate the values of modernity, democracy, tolerance, and women's rights in the Middle East – advancing them as universal values essential to the region's progress. He has lectured at universities throughout the world and various international institutions and think tanks, such as the Heritage Foundation, the Carnegie Endowment for International Peace, and the Council on Foreign Relations.

Heggy's main themes are the need for economic, political, cultural and educational reforms in Egypt and the Middle East. He emphasizes respect for individual rights and the power of human reason to drive the sciences forward. He is an advocate of creativity and the arts, gender equality, free markets, non-sectarian public administration, and the utilization of modern management techniques.

Tarek Heggy’s two books (published just before the Arab Spring), The Arab Cocoon (2010) and The Arab Mind Bound (2011), examine if and why the Arab world is resistant to Western forms of progress. Heggy puts forth that it is Arab culture, broadly construed, that is holding the region back. He believes that neither U.S. foreign policy nor the existence of Israel are the primary reasons for this.  Nor does he believe European colonialism, the global capitalist system, or the league of autocratic rulers who clung (and in places, continue to cling) to power thanks to oil revenues or outside military aid are the causes.  Heggy draws on his cosmopolitan background, business experience, and discussions with public intellectuals of every persuasion to critique Arab culture.

The mindset Heggy describes is prone to a literal, politicized version of Islam, which is a major contributor to the Arab malaise. The core of Heggy’s most important contention is encapsulated by this metaphor in The Arab Mind Bound: Arab culture is “shackled with two heavy chains”: attached to one is the species of Islam promulgated by Saudi Wahhabis and to a lesser extent, the Muslim Brotherhood; attached to the other is a dysfunctional educational system that perpetuates the “defective thought processes, intellectual distortions and negative delusions” that yield endemic stagnation in every sphere. It follows that no attempt to address the myriad political and economic problems facing the Arab-Islamic world will be successful without religious, cultural, and educational reforms.

According to Bernard Lewis, a Cleveland E. Dodge Professor Emeritus of Near Eastern Studies at Princeton University, Heggy is a "courageous and distinctive voice from Egypt" and provides "a candid and provocative inside view of the current problems of the Arab world." Heggy has participated in the BBC/Doha Debate on the Separation of Mosque and State.

Early life and education
Heggy studied law (LL.B & LL.M) at Ain Shams University in Cairo, followed by higher degrees in Modern Management Techniques from the International Management Institute of Geneva University. From 1973 till 1979 he was associate professor of Law at Constantine University/Algeria and the University of Fes/Morocco.

Career
In July 1979, Heggy joined a major gas and oil company as an attorney (1979–1985) and went on to become deputy to the Chairman of its Egypt branch (1985–1988).  In 1988 he became its Chairman and CEO, from which he resigned on July 1, 1996.

Heggy participated in establishing (in 2000) the "Chair of Coptic Studies" at the American University in Cairo as well as the Tarek Heggy Graduate Scholarship for Jewish-Muslim Relations at the University of Toronto.

Heggy received the 2008 Grinzane Cavour Award for cultural and literary achievement as well as the Tenth Anniversary Award Recipients/Arab World Books' Writers.

Bibliography
Since April 1978, Tarek Heggy has written 19 books In Arabic (plus 15 in English, French & Italian).

Books in English:
 On Management and Petroleum Industry. 1991
 Egypt's Contemporary Problems. 1992
 Critique of Marxism. 1992
 Egyptian Political Essays. 2000
 Culture, Civilization & Humanity. (Published in the UK and US by Frank Cass) 2003 
 The Fall of Socialism. 2009
 The Arab Cocoon. (Published by Vallentine Mitchell in the UK, US) 2010 
 The Arab Mind Bound. (Valentine Mitchell Publishers, UK and US) 2011
 Islamism and Modernity: an Unconventional Perspective. (FEEM press publisher, editor Guilio Sapelli). 2014 
 The Plague of Radicalism. (Roznameh Publisher) 2016

Books in Arabic:
 Marxist Ideas In Balance. 1978
 Communism And Religion. 1980
 My Experience With Marxism. 1983
 What is to be done? 1986
 The Four Idols. 1988
 The Trinity of Destruction. 1990
 Egypt between two Earthquakes. 1991
 The Fateful Transformation. 1993
 Reflections on Egypt 's Realities. 1995
 Critique of the Arab Mind. 1998
 Culture First and Foremost. 2000
 The Values of Progress. 2001
 On the Egyptian Mind. 2003
 Margins on The Egyptian Mind. 2004
 Modern Management in the contemporary Arab Societies. 2006
 The Prisons of the Arab Mind. (Merit Publishers, Cairo) 2009
 Our Culture Between Illusion and Reality. 2009
 DANAT. (Dar al Horryiah Publisher, Cairo) 2012
 The Plague of Radicalism (Akhbar-el-Youm publisher) 2019

Books in French:
 L'inéluctable Transformation. 1991
 Le Djinn Radical. (Published by L'Harmattan, Paris) 2010 
 L'esprit Arabe Enchaîné (Published by L'Harmattan. Paris) 2012
 Peste du Radicalisme (Édition Roznameh) 2016

Books in Italian:
 Le Prigioni Della Mente Araba (translated by Valentina Columbo). (Published by Marietti 1820 - Casa Editrice Marietti, Milan Italy) 2010

See also 
Lists of Egyptians

References

Further reading

External links
 Tarek Heggy interviews
 Reform and Modernization in the Arab and Muslim World
 Arab World articles

Egyptian journalists
Egyptian writers
People from Port Said
1950 births
Living people
Ain Shams University alumni
University of Geneva alumni